The Sacred Heart Cathedral is a Roman Catholic cathedral in Mandalay, Myanmar. Consecrated in 1890, the cathedral is located on 81st Road between 25th and 26th streets.

It serves as the headquarters of the Metropolitan Archdiocese of Mandalay (Archidioecesis Mandalayensis), follows the Roman or Latin rite and is decorated with blue and white colors. It was dedicated as its name indicates the Sacred Heart of Jesus a traditional Catholic devotion honoring the Heart of Jesus of Nazareth, as a symbol of divine love.

The cathedral offers Burmese language masses all week and Friday and Saturday some services in English. On the outside of the cathedral is located a small chapel with the image of Jesus.

See also
Roman Catholicism in Myanmar
Sacred Heart Cathedral (disambiguation)

References

Roman Catholic cathedrals in Myanmar
Buildings and structures in Mandalay